Liausson is a commune in the Hérault département in the Occitanie region in southern France.

Population

Sights
The church was built on the ruined foundations of a Roman villa

Gallery

See also
Communes of the Hérault department

References

Communes of Hérault